Into the Glorious is the second studio album by contemporary Christian music artist Christy Nockels, released on April 3, 2012 by sixstepsrecords and Sparrow Records.

Critical reception

AllMusic's James Christopher Monger said that the album is "offering up an agreeable mix of folk, country, and pop".

CCM Magazine's Matt Conner said the album is "yet another strong release in the Sixsteps Records catalog."

Christian Music Zine's Joshua Andre said that the album "has taken me by surprise and has exceeded all of the bars that were set by her first album."

Christianity Todays Andrew Greer said that the album "tenderly explores human brokenness and spiritual healing in an intimate musical context that may best represent Nockels' personal faith on tape to date."Louder Than the Music's Jono Davies said that "I could go on about each track on this album, yet the overall view of it is that musically this album is of the slower tempo genre with infused worship lyrics. These big ballads are sung with passion and desire to see Jesus being declared as the King of kings. So if you're looking for from-the-heart worship, no matter if you're male or female, young or old, then this new album from Christy is one of the most beautiful twelve track albums that you will find this year.  "New Release Tuesday's Kevin Davis said "was well worth the almost three year wait. Every song is worshipful, catchy, moving and powerful. This is my favorite female solo album of the year along with Audrey Assad’s Heart."Worship Leaders Jeremy Armstrong said that the album is "experience will be simultaneously confusing and pleasurable."  Armstrong wrote that "Once Into the Glorious'' eases in, it simply resonates with the journey of faith."

Track listing

Charts
Album

Singles

References

2012 albums
Sparrow Records albums
Christy Nockels albums